Lake Männiku is a lake in Männiku, Estonia.

See also
List of lakes of Estonia

Manniku
Saku Parish
Landforms of Tallinn
Manniku